Guy Nève de Mevergnies (24 April 1955 – 28 June 1992), commonly known as Guy Nève, was a Belgian racing driver. Nève was killed in practice for a Procar endurance race on a temporary track in Chimay, Belgium. While driving a Porsche 911, Nève clipped a competitor, veered off the track and hit a grass bank, flipping several times before coming to rest on its roof. During the crash, fuel ignited and set the car on fire. Nève was 37 years old. He was the younger brother of fellow racer Patrick Nève.

References 
Motorsport Memorial

1955 births
1992 deaths
Racing drivers who died while racing
Sport deaths in Belgium
Belgian racing drivers
Filmed deaths in motorsport
Walloon sportspeople
24 Hours of Spa drivers
20th-century Belgian people